Sasha Kekauoha (born July 26, 1985), best known by the stage name Sasha Colby, is an American drag performer and beauty pageant competitor. In 2012, she won the Miss Continental competition.

Early life
Sasha Colby was born in Waimānalo, Hawaii. She was raised in a conservative, Jehovah's Witness household.

Career
Sasha Colby has been described as a "beauty queen", a "drag legend", and a "pageant legend". She won the Miss Continental competition in 2012.

She has also been described as a "trans model and activist". In 2020, Sasha Colby represented Hawaii in GLAAD's video, which featured drag queens from all 50 states and Washington, D.C., and sought to mobilize voters in the 2020 U.S. presidential election. Before the COVID-19 pandemic, she organized a monthly trans-inclusive event at The Chapel, a gay bar in West Hollywood, California.

In 2018, Sasha Colby was cast in Sasha Velour's drag showcase NightGowns and appeared in the stage show's 2020 docu-series. Alongside other drag queens, Sasha Colby walked the runway before Jennifer Lopez's performance at the iHeartRadio Music Awards wearing a look inspired by Lopez. Chrissy Callahan of NBC News said Sasha Colby's look "channeled" the "Jenny from the Block" music video.
 She is the "drag mother" of season fourteen contestant Kerri Colby.

In 2023, Sasha Colby was cast on RuPaul's Drag Race for the fifteenth season of the franchise.

Personal life 
Sasha Colby is a trans woman. She is a Native Hawaiian, the first to be cast on Drag Race. She is based in Chicago and Los Angeles. She has previously suffered from addiction to crystal meth, stated by herself during Miss Continental.

Filmography

Television

Web series

Music videos

References

External links
 Sasha Colby at IMDb

Living people
American drag queens
Beauty pageant contestants
LGBT Native Hawaiians
LGBT people from California
LGBT people from Hawaii
LGBT people from Illinois
Native Hawaiian people
People from Chicago
People from Hawaii
People from Los Angeles
RuPaul's Drag Race contestants
Transgender drag performers
Transgender women
1985 births